The 1985 Giro d'Italia was the 68th edition of the Giro d'Italia, one of cycling's Grand Tours. The Giro began in Verona, with a prologue individual time trial on 16 May, and Stage 11 occurred on 28 May with a stage from Paola. The race finished in Lucca on 9 June.

Stage 11
28 May 1985 — Paola to Salerno,

Stage 12
29 May 1985 — Capua to Maddaloni,  (ITT)

Stage 13
30 May 1985 — Maddaloni to Frosinone,

Stage 14
31 May 1985 — Frosinone to Gran Sasso d'Italia,

Stage 15
1 June 1985 — L'Aquila to Perugia,

Stage 16
2 June 1985 — Perugia to Cecina,

Stage 17
3 June 1985 — Cecina to Modena,

Rest day
4 June 1985

Stage 18
5 June 1985 — Monza to Domodossola,

Stage 19
6 June 1985 — Domodossola to Saint-Vincent,

Stage 20
7 June 1985 — Saint-Vincent to Valnontey di Cogne,

Stage 21
8 June 1985 — Saint-Vincent to Genoa,

Stage 22
9 June 1985 — Lido di Camaiore to Lucca,  (ITT)

References

1985 Giro d'Italia
Giro d'Italia stages